Jacer Australia is an Australian racing car manufacturer. The company specialises in designing and constructing Formula Vee racing cars for the Australian market. Started by teenage racer Jason Cutts in Marsden Park, Sydney, the first car, called a "Cutts" debuted in October 1995 and won its first race that weekend at Eastern Creek Raceway. In 1997 Cutts won the Australian Nationals and backed it up with a second national title in 2000.

Originally intending to build just one car Cutts was soon requested to build cars for others. The name was quickly changed from Cutts to Jacer, an amalgamation of Jason and Racer. At this time Formula Vee in Australia was undergoing its first major technical innovation as 1600 cc Volkswagen engines were introduced to supplant and replace the aging 30-year-old 1200 cc which dated back to the categories creation in 1963. Jacer was able to capitalise on the resurgence of interest in the class.

Cutts elder brother David and father Alan took over the running of the company. Jacers have won multiple national and state series and national titles. Over 70 cars have been built, the majority of them 1600 cc cars. Cars have been exported to North America and won titles in Canada.

See also

 List of automobile manufacturers
 List of car brands

References

External links
 Jacer

Car manufacturers of Australia
Australian racecar constructors
Australian brands